The Poly Post is the student newspaper at California State Polytechnic University, Pomona (Cal Poly Pomona).  When classes are in session, it publishes every Tuesday throughout the school year. Michael Yu is the current editor-in-chief.

General information 
The Poly Post is a forum for student expression and is written, edited and managed by university students and one faculty advisor. It was founded in 1940 as the Bronc's Cheer when the university was still in San Dimas. The name was changed to The Poly Views in 1942 and finally to The Poly Post in 1962.  The newspaper changed from a bi-weekly (Tuesday and Thursday) to a weekly (Tuesday) publication in the early 1990s.

It is overseen by the Department of Communication, which sets policies for the Poly Post and other campus communications media.

The Poly Posts website is hosted by of MTV Network's mtvU, which distributes and promotes its content to their network

See also 
List of student newspapers

Past Editor-in-Chief
Ashley Schofield (2007-2008)
Daniel Ucko (2008-2009)
Amanda Newfield (2009-2010)
Greg Toumassian (2010-2011)
Cecily Arambula (2011-2012)
Andrew Canales (2012-2013) 
Anneli Fogt (2013-2014)
Salina Nasir (2014-2015)
Adrian Danganan (2015-2016)
Olivia Levada Lenoir (2016-2017)
Chloe Saunders (2017-2018)
David Wilson (2018-2019)
Elizabeth Hernandez (2019-2020)
Daniela Avila (2020-2021)
Georgia Valdes (2021-2022)
Michael Yu (2022–present)

References

External links 
 Official The Poly Post Website

California State Polytechnic University, Pomona
Cal Poly Pomona student life
Newspapers published in Greater Los Angeles
Student newspapers published in California
Weekly newspapers published in California